Pepper Winters is a novelist best known for dark romance, contemporary, romantic suspense, and erotica thrillers. Her romantic novels have reached The New York Times, The Wall Street Journal, and USA Today best sellers. She received the IndieReader Badge for a Top 10 Indie Bestseller in the romantic novels category. She currently has 30 books released in nine languages.

Background
Born and raised in Hong Kong, Winters draw on her English roots to pen complex characters who live all around the world. Married, she has a house rabbit that keeps her company while writing. 
She has built her career upon eroticism and romanticism. As an author, she is drawn to stories that clasp audience's desire. Winters saw success with the launch of her first book Tears of Tess in 2013. The book was listed on Top 20 Amazon Bestseller list while many others, including Ruin & Rule, Destroyed, and Indebted Series have been landed on the USA Todays Best-Selling Books list and The New York Times Best Seller list. Winters has twelve publications, including her recent release Unseen Messages which focuses on a survival contemporary novel. Many of her books have been translated into foreign languages. Her books enjoy global accolades and currently being adapted into an audio. 
She is considered a hybrid author, having successfully self-published while maintaining active contracts with Grand Central, Hachette.

Bibliography

Dark Romance Books
 
 
 
Pepper Winters (2016). Je Suis à Toi (Monsters in the Dark #3.5). 
 
 
 
 
 
 
 
Pepper Winters (2016). Pennies (Dollar #1). 
Pepper Winters (2016). Dollars (Dollar #2). 
Pepper Winters (2017). Hundreds (Dollar #3). 
Pepper Winters (2017). Thousands (Dollar #4). 
Pepper Winters (2017). Millions (Dollar #5). 
Pepper Winter (2020). Once A Myth (Goddess Isles #1). 
Pepper Winter (2020). Twice A Wish (Goddess Isles #2). 
Third A Kiss (Goddess Isles #3) coming April 2020.
Fourth A Lie (Goddess Isles #4) coming May 2020.
Fifth A Fury (Goddess Isles #5) coming June 2020.

Grey Romance Books

Pepper Winters (2015). Ruin & Rule (Pure Corruption MC #1). 
 Pepper Winters (2016). Sin & Suffer (Pure Corruption MC #2). 
Pepper Winters (2017). Crown of Lies (Truth & Lies Duet #1). 
Pepper Winters (2017). Throne of Truth (Truth & Lies Duet #2). 
Pepper Winters (2019). The Body Painter (Master of Trickery Duet #1). 
Pepper Winters (2019). The Living Canvas (Master of Trickery Duet #2).

Contemporary Romance Books

Pepper Winters (2018). The Boy & His Ribbon (The Ribbon Duet #1). 
Pepper Winters (2018). The Girl & Her Ren (The Ribbon Duet #2). 
Pepper Winter (2019). The Son & His Hope.

References

External links 
 

21st-century American writers
American women novelists
Hong Kong people
Year of birth missing (living people)
Living people
21st-century American women writers